Peter Chung (born March 25, 1979), better known by his stage name Cool Calm Pete, is a Korean American rapper and producer from Seoul, Korea, who is currently based in Queens, New York.  Cool Calm Pete has been profiled in major publications such as URB and XXL. He is a founding member of the hip hop trio Babbletron.

Life and career 
Pete was born in Seoul, Korea and was moved to and raised in Queens, New York by the time he was a toddler. Cool Calm Pete attended Cooper Union and received his BFA in fine arts, focusing on painting. Pete is one of the three members of the hip-hop group Babbletron, alongside DJ Pre and Jaymanila. It featured production from RJD2 and MF DOOM, among others.  Cool Calm Pete's debut solo album Lost was released in the United States on Embedded Music, and released in Europe on Definitive Jux. He has since released a 9 track EP entitled "Loosies," featuring several remixes of his older work. Pete currently works in graphic design.

Personal life 
According to Sophia Chang, an illustrator and designer that interned for Cool Calm Pete, said "He actually hates the spotlight. I think that’s extremely respectful."

Style 
Cool Calm Pete is known for his distinct rapping style. He has been described for having a certain smooth and relaxed-sounding rapping style.

Discography
Albums
Mechanical Royalty (Embedded Music - 2003) - with Jaymanila and DJ Pre as Babbletron
Lost (Embedded Music - 2005)

EPs
Loosies - Remixes and Other Oddities (Definitive Jux - 2007)

Singles
"Black Friday (Cool Calm Pete song) Black Friday" (Definitive Jux - 2002)
"Lost the Single" (Embedded Music - 2005)
"Gitty Up Baby" (Definitive Jux - 2007)
"Get with the Times" (Definitive Jux - 2007)
"Heart (Cool Calm Pete song) Heart" (Definitive Jux - 2009)
"Offline" (Modern Shark - 2011)
"These Daze" (bubble wife records - 2022)

Mixtapes
"The Food Theme." (Theme Magazine - 2009)
"Over You." (Modern Shark - 2010)
"The Ups & Downs."  (Modern Shark - 2011)

References

External links
Embedded Music page
Definitive Jux - Bio
Over You Mixtape Download

American male rappers
Living people
Rappers from New York City
1979 births
21st-century American rappers
21st-century American male musicians